SH3 domain and tetratricopeptide repeats-containing protein 2 is a protein that in humans is encoded by the SH3TC2 gene. It is believed to be expressed in the Schwann cells that wrap the myelin sheath around nerves.

Function 

This gene encodes a protein with two N-terminal Src homology 3 (SH3) domains and 10 tetratricopeptide repeat (TPR) motifs, and is a member of a small gene family. The gene product has been proposed to be an adapter or docking molecule.

The mouse version (orthologue) of SH3TC2 is believed to be expressed in Schwann cells. The tagged protein localizes to the plasma membrane and to the perinuclear endocytic recycling compartment. Mice lacking Sh3tc2 have an abnormal organization of the node of Ranvier consistent with the idea that the protein might have a role in myelination or in axon – glial cell interactions.

Clinical significance 

Mutations in this gene result in autosomal recessive Charcot-Marie-Tooth disease type 4C, a childhood-onset neurodegenerative disease characterized by demyelination of motor and sensory neurons.

References

Further reading

External links
  GeneReviews/NCBI/NIH/UW entry on Charcot-Marie-Tooth Neuropathy Type 4
  GeneReviews/NCBI/NIH/UW entry on Charcot-Marie-Tooth Neuropathy Type 4C